The golden-mantled ground squirrel (Callospermophilus lateralis) is a ground squirrel native to western North America. It is distributed in the Rocky Mountains of British Columbia and Alberta, and through much of the western United States.

Description
The weight range for adults is between 120 and 394 grams (0.26 to 0.86 lbs.) It has whitish or yellow-gray underparts. The tail is brown to black with buff edges and a yellowish to reddish underside. It has pale rings around the eyes. The "mantle" across the shoulders is tawny to reddish, with males having a deeper reddish tinge. This species is distinguished from similar ground squirrels by a black-bordered white stripe down each side of the back and is distinguished from similar looking chipmunks by its lack of facial stripes.

Some authors describe many subspecies of this taxon.

Biology and ecology

This species occurs in forests, chaparral, meadow margins, and sagebrush, especially in areas with many rocks or forest litter that provides shelter. It is associated with many kinds of coniferous trees, aspen, and manzanita.

It is omnivorous, feeding on pine nuts, acorns, herbs and shrubs, fungi, many kinds of insects, eggs, young birds, lizards, carrion, and human foods when available. This species caches food near its burrow, especially during the late summer and fall. The squirrel has also been known to "beg" for human food at the wildlife urban interface.

This species hibernates over the winter. During the summers they gain extra weight in order to prepare for hibernation. The squirrels hibernate in dens that can reach up to 100 feet in length although they are typically shallow in depth. The breeding season commences when males and females emerge from hibernation in the spring. Most broods are born in July. A female has two to eight young per litter, with an average of five. There is no paternal care of the offspring. Juveniles resemble adults by 40 days of age. The life span of this ground squirrel is up to about seven years.

Most adults are independent, rarely cooperating, and usually competing for resources. They may assemble at sites with abundant food but develop a group hierarchy. Adults reside alone in burrows, creating nests for hibernation or rearing of young. This species has been known to nest in structures, such as roofs. This species becomes vocal when it feels threatened, making squeaking noises or growling. However, it is generally not a very vocal species.

Predators of this squirrel include snakes, foxes, weasels, and bears. It may carry the Rocky Mountain wood tick, a vector of Rocky Mountain spotted fever and other diseases.

Conservation
This is a common and widespread species that is not considered to be threatened.

References

External links
NatureServe. 2017. Callospermophilus lateralis. NatureServe Explorer V.7.1 Accessed 6 September 2017.
Golden-mantled Ground Squirrel.  North American Mammals. Smithsonian Museum of Natural History.

Callospermophilus
Fauna of the Northwestern United States
Fauna of the Southwestern United States
Mammals of Canada
Mammals of the United States
Fauna of the California chaparral and woodlands
Fauna of the Great Basin
Fauna of the Rocky Mountains
Fauna of the Sierra Nevada (United States)
Mammals described in 1823